Siamese Pipe is the second album by The Heroine Sheiks. It was released on October 1, 2002, by Rubric Records.

Critical reception
CMJ New Music Monthly called the album a "marshy fun-house of noise rock," writing that "the production is almost flawless."

Track listing

Personnel 
The Heroine Sheiks
John Fell – drums
Eric Eble – bass guitar, keyboards on "My Boss"
Shannon Selberg – vocals, keyboards, bugle
Norman Westberg – guitar
Production and additional personnel
Greg Gordon – production, mixing, recording
The Heroine Sheiks – production
Scott Hill – keyboards on "Kiss It"
Alex Lipsen – engineering
Dan Long – engineering
Scott Norton – engineering
Greg Vaughn – mastering

References

The Heroine Sheiks albums
2002 albums